Jeff Tate may refer to:

 Jeff Tate (footballer) (born 1959), English footballer
 Jeff Tate (politician), American politician in the Mississippi State Senate
 Jeffrey Tate (1943–2017), English conductor of classical music

See also
Geoff Tate, American heavy metal vocalist